"This Night" is a song by Billy Joel released as the sixth single from his album An Innocent Man. The basis of the song's chorus uses the second movement of Ludwig van Beethoven's Pathétique Sonata. Beethoven is credited as one of the song's writers on the sleeve of the album as "L.v. Beethoven". Joel has said in interviews that "This Night" was written about his brief relationship with supermodel Elle Macpherson, whom he dated just prior to second wife Christie Brinkley. 

The song was released as a single only in the UK and Japan, reached number 78 on the UK Singles Chart and number 88 on the Japanese Oricon Singles Chart. 

In the United States, "This Night" was the B-side of "Leave a Tender Moment Alone".

Track listing

7" single
"This Night"
"I'll Cry Instead" (live)

Japanese 7" single / CBS 07SP 722
"This Night"
"Careless talk"

Chart positions

References 

Songs about nights
1984 singles
Billy Joel songs
Songs written by Billy Joel
Song recordings produced by Phil Ramone
Columbia Records singles
Popular songs based on classical music
1984 songs